The Lorraine Hanriot LH.41 was a single-seat racing aircraft designed and built in France specifically to compete in the Coupe Michelin air races, held in France.

Design and development
The LH.41 was a small low-wing, cantilever monoplane built largely of wood with fabric and plywood skinning. The LH.41 was supported on a wide-track strut mounted undercarriage, incorporating oleo-pneumatic shock-absorbers, with a tail-skid.

For initial flight testing the LH.41 was fitted with a  Lorraine 7Mb Mizar 7-cylinder radial engine with a distinctive oil cooler on the port side of the fuselage forward of the cockpit. After initial testing the LH.41, re-engined with the intended  Lorraine 9Nb driving a Levasseur metal fixed pitch propeller fitted with a dorsal oil cooler in place of the side-mounted cooler. The 9Nb was fitted with a short chord Townend ring by the time the race began.

LH.41.02
Lorraine-Hanriot recovered the engine from the wreckage of the LH.41, tested it to ensure it was serviceable and fitted it to a new airframe, dubbed LH.41.02 (aka LH.41/2, or LH.41-2). The airframe was refined to give less drag, removing exterior bracing cables on the tail-unit and fully enclosing the engine in a NACA cowling.

LH.42

Another airframe was built, essentially identical to the LH.41.02, but with further improvements, including faired-in undercarriage legs.

Operational history
The LH.41 first flew in May 1930 and was duly entered in the 1929/1930 Coupe Michelin, flown by Marcel Haegelen. The LH.41 was beating the competition until an accident upon landing at Reims destroyed the aircraft and seriously injured Haegelen, after landing in tall grass.

After the 1931/1932 Coupe Michelin victory, Haegelen proposed a world record speed attempt for a  closed -circuit. Taking off on 31 August 1932 Haegelen completed the course but was unable to land at Étampes, on his return, due to bad weather. Diverting to Tours was fruitless, as the area was shrouded in fog. After circuiting Tour hoping for the fog to lift, Haegelen was forced to bail-out when the fuel was exhausted. The LH.42 continued on alone until it crashed near the Château du Loire.

Variants
LH.41.01A racing aircraft, primarily intended to compete in the Coupe Michelin. The sole example was destroyed in an accident during the 1929/1930 Coupe Michelin race.
LH.41.02A second machine built fitted with the Lorraine 9Nb recovered from the wreckage of the LH.41.01 driving a Ratier metal airscrew. Flown by Haegelen to victory in the 1930/1931 Coupe Michelin air race.
LH.42The LH.41.02 developed with an all-metal fuselage, increased fuel capacity, more refined aerodynamic features and fully cowled Lorraine 9Nb engine up-rated to  driving a Levasseur-Ratier metal airscrew. The LH.42 crashed during a world record attempt due to bad weather.

Specifications (LH.41)

References

Bibliography

L.041
1930s French civil aircraft
Racing aircraft
Low-wing aircraft
Aircraft first flown in 1930